Rech may refer to:

People
 Almine Rech, French art dealer
 Anthony Rech (born 1992), French ice hockey player
 Bianca Rech (born 1981), German football player
 Erich Rech, Iron Cross recipient
 Fernando Rech (born 1974), Brazilian football player
 Heribert Rech (born 1950), German lawyer and politician
 Jean Rech (1931–2017), French aerodynamicist
 Louis Rech (1926–2012), Luxembourgish politician
 Léo Ortiz (born 1996), Brazilian football player

Places
 Rech, Rhineland-Palatinate, Germany
 Rech Valley, Pakistan

Other
 Rech (newspaper)